Eriksen is a Norwegian duo consisting of siblings Rita Eriksen and Frank Eriksen both musicians and on vocals. The duo plays music in the roots, country, blues and folk genres.

Career
Eriksen was formed in 1989 and has released a series of studio albums, the first two with English lyrics. Their debut album Two Blue received the Norwegian Grammy Award 1992 in roots and country music.

They have collaborated with several artists, including the American blues musician Delbert McClinton who sang a duet with Rita Eriksen on the song "Movin' Time" written by Jeff Wasserman and Torstein Flakne on the album Two Blue. Eriksen sold 170,000 albums combined.

Sony BMG released the compilation album Eriksen - De aller beste (The very best) in the spring of 2009. The album was heavily promoted by television campaign, reached #1 in the Norwegian albums chart and went platinum.

Members

Rita Eriksen

Rita Eriksen (born May 26, 1966 in Sola) besides being a member of a duo ia also a famous solo artist in the same genres. She has recorded a number of albums notably Tideland (1996) together with the Irish singer Dolores Keane and  The Cardigans, Hjerteslag (2008) and Øyeblikk (2014). Rita Eriksen is also a member of vocal group Queen Bees with Anita Skorgan and Hilde Heltberg.

Frank Eriksen
Frank Eriksen (born 1961 in Sola, Norway) is a Norwegian guitarist and singer. In addition to his membership in the duo, he is a member of the Irish-inspired band The Tramps since 2000.

Discography

Studio albums

Eriksen Compilation Albums

Rita Eriksen discography
Refer to Rita Eriksen

Frank Eriksen (as part of The Tramps)
2000: Halfway to the Moon 
2002: Roadkill (live album) 
2004: Best of the Tramps (compilation album)

References

External links
Rita Eriksen Official website
Rita Eriksen MySpace site
The Tramps Official website (Frank Eriksen, member of the band)

Norwegian musical groups
Spellemannprisen winners
Musical groups established in 1989
People from Sola, Norway